Priocharax is a genus of characins, very small freshwater fish from the Amazon and Orinoco basins in tropical South America.

Species
There are currently three recognized species in this genus:

 Priocharax ariel S. H. Weitzman & Vari, 1987
 Priocharax pygmaeus S. H. Weitzman & Vari, 1987
 Priocharax nanus Toledo-Piza, Mattox & Britz, 2014

References

Characidae
Taxa named by Stanley Howard Weitzman
Taxa named by Richard Peter Vari
Fish of South America